The 2002 Arizona State Sun Devils football team represented Arizona State University during the 2002 NCAA Division I-A football season. They were coached by Dirk Koetter.

Schedule

Roster

References

Arizona State
Arizona State Sun Devils football seasons
Arizona State Sun Devils football